Sandrabatis is a genus of snout moths described by Émile Louis Ragonot in 1893.

The genus is morphologically similar to Psorosa Zeller, 1846, but it can be distinguished by the forewing with R2 stalked with R3+4.

Species
Sandrabatis crassiella Ragonot, 1893
Sandrabatis phaeella Hampson 1903

References
Ragonot, 1893, in Romanoff. Mémoires sur les lépidoptères. 7: xlvii, 203.
Sandrabatis. Butterflies and Moths of the World. Natural History Museum, London.

Phycitini
Taxa named by Émile Louis Ragonot
Pyralidae genera